Rashaya District is an administrative district in the Beqaa Governorate of the Republic of Lebanon. 

Most of Rachaya's population are Druze with a Sunni and Shia and Christian minority. Many people of Rachaya have left for larger cities in Lebanon such as Beirut. During the Lebanese civil war, Rachaya was not affected as much as other parts of Lebanon during the conflict.

Rachaya is known for its pottery and famous for the Church bells made in the town, the town is right next to the Anti-Lebanon mountain range in bordering Syria.

 
Districts of Lebanon